James Dickinson "Dick" Irvin Jr. (or II) (July 19, 1892 – May 16, 1957) was a Canadian professional ice hockey player and coach. He played for professional teams in the Pacific Coast Hockey Association, the Western Canada Hockey League, and the National Hockey League (NHL) from 1916 to 1928, when he had to retire from repeated injuries. Irvin was one of the greatest players of his day, balancing a torrid slap shot and tough style with gentlemanly play. For his playing career, Irvin was named to the Hockey Hall of Fame in 1958. After playing, Irvin built a successful career as a coach in the NHL with the Chicago Black Hawks, Toronto Maple Leafs, and Montreal Canadiens. He won one Stanley Cup as a coach with Toronto, three more with Montreal, finishing with over 600 wins as a coach. He also served in the Canadian Expeditionary Force during the First World War.

Early life
Irvin was born in Hamilton, Ontario, one of 10 children, six boys and four girls. Two of the boys died in infancy, and the four girls all died of tuberculosis at an early age. His father James Dickinson Irvin Sr. was a butcher. The family moved to Winnipeg, Manitoba, when Dick Jr. was eight.

Dick played hockey from an early age, following in the footsteps of his oldest brother Alex. Their father would drive his sons and other boys to games by horse and sleigh, relying often upon the horses' sense of direction in winter blizzards to return home safely. The family flooded the driveway of their home to create an ice rink which the Irvin sons would play on. Irvin also set up a shooting area in the attic of the home, where he would shoot a puck at the doorknob of an old door mounted sideways against a wall. 

Irvin first played senior hockey with the Winnipeg Strathconas at the early age of 12. The Strathconas were reserve team to support the Winnipeg Monarchs. During the 1914 Allan Cup, Irvin was ruled ineligible to compete for the Monarchs. Team president Fred Marples declared that the Monarchs refused to defend the cup without Irvin. After three days of negotiating, the Monarchs agreed to play without Irvin in a one-game Allan Cup challenge versus the Kenora Thistles, instead of the customary two-game series decided on total goals scored. The Canadian Amateur Hockey Association was established later in 1914, which determined player eligibility for the Allan Cup. Irvin was declared eligible for the Monarchs and won the 1915 Allan Cup after the team had defeated the Melville Millionaires over two games 7 goals to 6 (3-4, 4-2). There were no further challenges, and Irvin and the Monarchs ended the season as Allan Cup champions.

Irvin was also considered a top baseball player and he played on the Winnipeg Dominion Express team with his brothers Alex and George. Irvin was also a competitive curler.

Career
Irvin began his professional career in 1916 with the Portland Rosebuds of the Pacific Coast Hockey Association and was the fourth leading scoring rookie tallying 35 goals. Before the following season, the Canadian government instituted a draft in August 1917 and Irvin was conscripted into the Canadian Expeditionary Force in November 1917. Irvin was taken on by The Fort Garry Horse regiment in April 1918 and arrived in England in May 1918. He was transferred to France in August 1918 and in October was transferred to a signals unit as a motorcycle rider. The war ended in November 1918 and Irvin arrived back in Halifax in May 1919.

Irvin was reinstated as an amateur and he played three seasons with the Regina Victorias senior club. He returned to professional hockey in 1921 with the Regina Capitals of the Western Canada Hockey League. In 1926, at age 34, he entered the National Hockey League (NHL), signed by the newly formed Chicago Black Hawks. Irvin was made the team's first captain, and had an impressive campaign, finishing second in the league in scoring. In their first season, the Black Hawks led all NHL teams in scoring, led by Irvin and Babe Dye. Irvin's second season turned to tragedy as he fractured his skull, which led to retirement after the 1928–29 season, during which he had also added coaching duties. The Hawks had finished with the worst record in the NHL in both of his last two seasons as a player.

Irvin was hired as head coach of the Black Hawks in 1930, and in his first season behind the bench led the team to 24 wins, 17 losses and 3 ties. The Black Hawks made it to the Stanley Cup Final but lost and the Black Hawks released him in September 1931. That November, the Toronto Maple Leafs were winless after five games and manager Conn Smythe convinced Irvin to coach the Leafs. In his first season coaching the Leafs (the first in the brand-new Maple Leaf Gardens), he achieved immediate success by winning the Stanley Cup. Irvin would lead the Leafs to the finals six more times, but could not deliver another Cup to Toronto.

By the end of the 1939–40 season, which ended with yet another loss in the finals, Smythe believed that Irvin had taken the Leafs as far as he could and decided to replace him with former Leafs captain Hap Day, who had retired. Smythe also knew that he would be away in the war and felt that Irvin would not be tough enough without Smythe to back him up. 

Meanwhile, the Montreal Canadiens had just suffered a ten-win season (still the worst winning percentage in franchise history), and were looking for a new coach. Knowing that the Canadiens were in serious straits off the ice as well as on it, Smythe suggested that the Canadiens hire Irvin, solving both teams' issues. Although Smythe knew he was giving the Leafs' biggest rival a boost, Smythe knew that three teams had already folded during the Depression and didn't want the Canadiens to join them. Soon afterwards, Canadiens general manager Tommy Gorman picked Irvin up and drove him to Montreal to become coach of the team. Irvin and players from the Canadiens were featured in the instructional film Hockey Fundamentals in December 1941, produced by the Quebec Amateur Hockey Association to benefit local minor ice hockey players.

Irvin didn't take long to turn the Canadiens around. He had them back in the playoffs in his first season, and in his fourth season took them all the way to the Stanley Cup—the first of six finals appearances and three Cups. Helped by star players Elmer Lach, Doug Harvey, goalie Bill Durnan and a young Maurice Richard, the Canadiens were just beginning to blossom as an NHL dynasty. Although Irvin found his greatest success in Montreal, he came under fire for encouraging "goon" tactics, especially after Montreal fans rioted in protest of Richard's season-ending suspension for attacking a referee. He was already well known for looking the other way when stick-swinging duels broke out in practices. Although they made it to the Final (losing to the Detroit Red Wings), internal pressure forced Irvin to step down.

He returned to the Black Hawks as head coach for the 1955–56 season, taking the reins of a moribund team that had only made the playoffs once in the past 10 years and finished last in the past two seasons. Irvin was unable to turn the team's fortunes around, and the Black Hawks again ended the year in last place, despite the emergence of Ed Litzenberger as a scoring star. Irvin was to coach the Black Hawks again in 1956–57, but he became so ill with bone cancer that he had to retire before the season began. He died a few months later at age 64 in Montreal.

A year later, Irvin was elected into the Hockey Hall of Fame. His coaching career included four Stanley Cups with 692 regular season wins. Among the seven coaches with four Stanley Cup championships, only Al Arbour and Scotty Bowman have more wins than Irvin.

Playing style

When PCHA president Frank Patrick signed Irvin to his league for the 1916–17 season, to play with the Portland Rosebuds, he claimed the 23-year old former Winnipeg amateur centre ice man was "the greatest forward who ever came into the Pacific Coast League" and predicted that before the end of the season Irvin would be "one of the best players in the country." Patrick hailed Irvin as a "natural-born goal getter" who "scores from almost any possible angle."

After a slow start in Portland, where Irvin himself was convinced that he was not to be given a chance to properly display his worth as a player, later on confessing that he had had early thoughts on leaving the league and returning home to Winnipeg, he was finally injected into a game in Portland and made good with a vengeance. At the end of the season he had lived up to Frank Patrick's high expectations and he almost caught up with the top point producers in the league, finally finishing 4th in goals and 5th in points despite his slow start to the season where he sat on the bench for most of the first five games.

Irvin was not only clean playing but also a clean living individual who did not touch either alcohol or nicotine, figuring a perfect health would be one of his best assets, to go along with his deceptive wig-wagging moves and his dangerous shooting ability on the ice.

Personal
Irvin kept a home in Regina, Saskatchewan, for most of his life, before buying a home in Mount Royal in 1954. Irvin married Bertha Helen Bain and fathered two children, daughter Fay and son James Dickinson Irvin III (known as Dick, Jr.) who is a noted Canadian television sports announcer. He was a noted pigeon fancier. Irvin died at his Mount Royal home. According to his obituary in the Montreal Gazette, Irvin "died after a lingering illness. [He] had to retire because of the illness that was finally to snuff out his colorful life." He was interred in Mount Pleasant Cemetery, Toronto.

Irvin was portrayed in the 2005 Maurice Richard biopic The Rocket by Canadian actor Stephen McHattie.

Tribute
Upon learning of Irvin's death, NHL president Clarence Campbell issued this statement which appeared in the Montreal Gazette on May 17, 1957: "Everyone in the hockey world mourns. [We have lost] one of the greatest figures the game has ever known."

Career statistics

Regular season and playoffs

Coaching record

Awards and achievements 
Allan Cup Championship (1915)
Stanley Cup Championships as a coach (1932 – Toronto, 1944, 1946, and 1953 – Montreal)
Lost in the finals a record 12 times as a coach (1931 – Chicago, 1933-35-36-38-39-40 – Toronto, 1947-51-52-54-55 – Montreal)
NHL First All-Star Team Coach (1944, 1945, 1946)
NHL Second All-Star Team Coach (1931, 1932, 1933, 1934, 1935, 1941)
Inducted into the Manitoba Sports Hall of Fame and Museum in 1983
Selected to Manitoba's All-Century First All-Star Team and named Coach of the Century
Honoured Member of the Manitoba Hockey Hall of Fame

See also
 Notable families in the NHL

References

Bibliography

External links

Dick Irvin's biography at Canadian Sports Hall of Fame
Dick Irvin's biography at Manitoba Hockey Hall of Fame

1892 births
1957 deaths
Burials at Mount Pleasant Cemetery, Toronto
Canadian Expeditionary Force soldiers
Canadian male curlers
Chicago Blackhawks captains
Chicago Blackhawks coaches
Chicago Blackhawks players
Canadian ice hockey centres
Canadian ice hockey coaches
Curlers from Hamilton, Ontario
Curlers from Winnipeg
Deaths from bone cancer
Deaths from cancer in Quebec
Hockey Hall of Fame inductees
Ice hockey people from Ontario
Ice hockey people from Winnipeg
Ice hockey player-coaches
Manitoba Sports Hall of Fame inductees
Montreal Canadiens coaches
Portland Rosebuds players
Regina Capitals players
Sportspeople from Hamilton, Ontario
Stanley Cup champions
Stanley Cup championship-winning head coaches
Toronto Maple Leafs coaches
Winnipeg Monarchs players